The 2nd Japan Record Award was held on December 30, 1960. They recognized musical accomplishments by performers for the year 1960. Kazuko Matsuo, Hiroshi Wada & Mahina Stars won the Japan Record Award, being the first duet that achieve the award. This is also the first time that the new artist award was given.

Emcee
Takayuki Akutagawa

Award winners
Japan Record Award
 Kazuko Matsuo, Hiroshi Wada & Mahina Stars for "Dare Yorimo Kimi Wo Aisu" 
 Lyricist: Kōhan Kawauchi
 Composer: Tadashi Yoshida
 Arranger: Hiroshi Wada
 Record Company: JVC Victor

Vocalist Award
Hibari Misora for "Aishuu Hatoba"

New Artist Award
Yukio Hashi for "Itakogasa"

Composer Award
Koga Masao for "Shiroi Koyubi No Uta"
Singer: Chiyoko Shimakura

Planning Award
Nippon Columbia for "Zundoko Bushi" & "Danchone Bushi"
Singer: Akira Kobayashi

Children's Song Award
Minakami Fusako & Kingu Kobatokai for "Yuuran Bus"

References

Japan Record Awards
Japan Record Awards
Japan Record Awards
1960